The pygmy flowerpecker (Dicaeum pygmaeum) is a species of bird in the family Dicaeidae.
It is endemic to the Philippines.

Its natural habitats are tropical moist lowland forest and tropical moist montane forest.

References

pygmy flowerpecker
Endemic birds of the Philippines
pygmy flowerpecker
Taxa named by Heinrich von Kittlitz
Taxonomy articles created by Polbot